The Individual Speedway European Championship is an annual individual speedway event organized by the European Motorcycle Union (UEM) to determine the champion of Europe. The competition was founded in 2001 and was initially staged as a one-off meeting before the single event was replaced by the Speedway European Championship series in 2012.

History 
From 1955 to 1975, the European Final was staged as the final qualifying round for the World Speedway Championship, although this did not include British riders who had a separate qualifying round.

The European Championships were inaugurated in 2001, organised by European Motorcycle Union (UEM). In 2012 this was replaced by a series of four finals. Regardless of that, ISEC was struggling with prestige and promotion and the best European riders were mostly avoiding this contest.

On 20 December 2012, at a press conference in Warsaw, Poland it was announced that the competition would be replaced by a new series similar in format to the Speedway Grand Prix. The Speedway European Championship series is promoted by One Sporta Ltd. from Poland for next three seasons (2013-2015).

As of 2022, the competition is staged over four rounds in a Grand Prix format, with the winner being the rider who accumulates the most points over the four rounds. The minimum age of a rider to compete is 16 years of age (starting on the date of the rider's birthday).

Denmark is the most successful nation having had six champions, Jesper B. Jensen (2005), Nicki Pedersen (2016), Leon Madsen (2018 and 2022) and Mikkel Michelsen (2019 and 2021).

Winners

European Final (1955-1975)

Individual European Championship (2001-2011)

European Championship series (since 2012)

Medals classification

See also
 Motorcycle speedway
 Speedway Grand Prix

References 

 
Individual